Glastening (or Glastenning) refers to an old Welsh pedigree mentioned by William of Malmesbury possibly associated with  Glastonbury.

Associated genealogies

Modern and medieval historians have sought to associate various versions of the same Old Welsh pedigree with Glastonbury. The earliest genealogy is a 10th-century text, the Harleian Genealogies, preserved in London,  British Library, Harley MS 3859, which ends with Glast and states unum sunt Glastenic qui uenerunt que uocatur Loytcoyt, or "one of those who came to Glastenning from the place called Luit-Coyt" (modern Lichfield).

Other versions are given in the later Achau Brenhinoedd a Thywysogion Cymru and William of Malmesbury's De antiquitate Glastonie ecclesie, where the pedigree is listed as brothers. From the versions it not clear whether Glast was a personal name or a kindred group as Glastening, "descendants of Glasten", or an epithet Glas meaning "the Blue, Green or Grey".

In literature
The Glastening may be connected in some way to the Sumorsaete, an obscure Anglo-Saxon group who may have given their name to Somerset. According to William of Malmesbury, Glast was one of twelve brothers who migrated from the north to assume control of parts of Wales (the Britons still held much of the west of Britain) who were great-grandsons of Cunedda. He settled in Glastonbury with his livestock after finding it deserted. The 14th century codex from Oxford, Bodleian Library, Jesus College 20, actually gives Glas map Elno (or Elnaw) as the great-grandson of Cunedda.

David Thornton finds "no strong evidence" for the association of the pedigree of the Glastening with Glastonbury other than the similarity of the names. He concludes that the Glastening had an association with Lichfield (problems of textual corruption making it difficult to be precise about the relationship) and that "their sojourn in Glastonbury, however, is the product of medieval pseudo-historical thought supported by the zealous ingenuity of subsequent scholars."

It is unclear when Glastonbury was first established, but it is first recorded in the 7th and the early 8th centuries, as Glestingaburg. The burg element is Anglo-Saxon and could refer either to a fortified place such as a burh or, more likely, a monastic enclosure. However the Glestinga element is obscure, and may derive from an Old English word or from a Saxon or Celtic personal name.

References

See also
Wikisource: Harleian MS 3859 Genealogies

Anglo-Saxon England